The 1915 Idaho football team represented the University of Idaho in the 1915 college football season.  Idaho was led by first-year head coach Charles Rademacher and played as an independent; they joined the Pacific Coast Conference seven years later  Idaho had two home games in Moscow on campus at MacLean Field, with none in Boise.

In the season opener, Idaho fell to Montana for the first time in the series' third meeting, losing   Idaho dropped a second consecutive shutout to Washington State in the Battle of the Palouse, falling    Eight years later, the Vandals won the first of three consecutive, their only three-peat in the rivalry series.

Idaho opened the season with four losses, then won and tied a game for a  record. They scored just nine points all season, and the only touchdown was an interception return, which defeated . Their only points on offense came on a drop-kick field goal in the first quarter of the opener at Montana.

A fatality occurred at practice on October 6; a part-time player, Chauncey Lyman  of Idaho Falls, was knocked unconscious after his head impacted a ball carrier's thigh. Lyman died about an hour later, and the cause of death was a [[Basilar skull fracture|basilar

Schedule

 The Little Brown Stein trophy for the Montana game debuted 23 years later in 1938
 One game was played on Thursday (against Whitman at Moscow on Thanksgiving)

References

External links
Gem of the Mountains: 1917 University of Idaho yearbook (spring 1916) – 1915 football season
Go Mighty Vandals – 1915 football season
Official game program: Washington State at Idaho – October 30, 1915
Idaho Argonaut – student newspaper – 1915 editions

Idaho
Idaho Vandals football seasons
Idaho football